Heugyeomso-tang or Korean black goat stew, also known as Heugyeomso-jeongol, is a Korean goat stew made from Korean Native goat (Capra hircus coreanae; KNG) the only breed of goats indigenous to Korea. There are variations, many of which contain perilla seeds, soybean paste, red pepper paste, mushrooms, and green vegetables such as leeks, cabbage, or perilla leaves.

References

Korean soups and stews
Goat dishes